The 2000 United States Senate election in Florida was held on November 7, 2000, on the same date as the U.S. House of Representatives and presidential election. Incumbent Republican Senator Connie Mack III decided to retire instead of seeking a third term. Democrat Bill Nelson won the open seat, even as Republican presidential nominee George W. Bush narrowly triumphed over Al Gore in the state by a mere 537 votes.

Republican primary

Candidates 
 Hamilton A. S. Bartlett
 Bill McCollum, U.S. Representative

Results

Democratic primary

Candidates 
 Newall Jerome Daughtrey, nominee for Florida State Comptroller in 1998
 David B. Higginbottom, nominee for FL-10 in 1986 and 1988
 Bill Nelson, State Treasurer and former U.S. Representative

Results

General election

Candidates

Major 
 Bill McCollum (R), U.S. Representative
 Bill Nelson (D), State Treasurer and former U.S. Representative

Minor 
 Joel Deckard (Re), former U.S. Representative from Indiana
 Willie Logan (I), State Representative
 Andy Martin (I), perennial candidate
 Darrell McCormick (I)
 Joe Simonetta (NL)
 Nikki Oldaker (WI)

Campaign 
This election was in conjunction to the presidential election, where Bush narrowly defeated Gore after an intense recount. The Senate election was evenly matched, with two U.S. Congressmen named Bill in their mid-50s. Both parties heavily targeted this senate seat. The election became very nasty as Nelson called his opponent "an extremist who would sacrifice the elderly, the poor, and the  working class to coddle the rich." McCollum called the Democrat "a liberal who would tax everything that moves, and some things that don't." The election advertisements were very negative, as both candidates talked more about each other than themselves.

Nelson raised only soft money, but had help from Gore and President Bill Clinton. Two days before the election, McCollum predicted he would win by a 6-point margin. On election day, he lost by a five-point margin.

Debates
Complete video of debate, October 12, 2000

Results

See also 
 2000 United States Senate elections

References 

2000
Florida
2000 Florida elections